Wyoming Village Historic District may refer to:

Wyoming Village Historic District (Wyoming, New York), listed on the National Register of Historic Places
Wyoming Village Historic District in the village of Wyoming, Rhode Island, listed on the National Register
Village Historic District in Wyoming, Ohio